Rae Road is the first solo album of original music by  Mark Rae, the DJ, musician and boss of Grand Central Records.

Track listing
 "Lobster"
 "Lavish" (featuring Veba)
 "Make No Mistake"
 "Skio"
 "Bamburgh Dunes"
 "Candystripe" (featuring Joseph Cotton) 
 "The Dime Train"
 "I Need A Fix"
 "I'm Fast And Hot"
 "Fold Or Flower" (featuring Veba)
 "Sick Chick"
 "Throne" (featuring Spikey T)

References

Grand Central Records albums
Mark Rae albums
2002 albums